Scrobipalpula ochroschista is a moth in the family Gelechiidae. It was described by Edward Meyrick in 1929. It is found in North America, where it has been recorded from Texas.

References

Scrobipalpula
Moths described in 1929